Cheshmeh Kabud or Chashmeh Kabud may refer to:

Hamadan Province
Cheshmeh Kabud, Bahar
Cheshmeh Kabud, Nahavand

Ilam Province
Cheshmeh Kabud, Ilam
Cheshmeh Kabud, Shirvan and Chardaval

Kermanshah Province
Cheshmeh Kabud, Eslamabad-e Gharb, a village in Eslamabad-e Gharb County
Cheshmeh Kabud, Gilan-e Gharb, a village in Gilan-e Gharb County
Cheshmeh Kabud, Harsin, a village in Harsin County
Cheshmeh Kabud, Bisotun, a village in Harsin County
Cheshmeh Kabud Rural District, in Harsin County
Cheshmeh Kabud, Kermanshah, a village in Kermanshah County
Cheshmeh Kabud, Firuzabad, a village in Kermanshah County
Cheshmeh Kabud-e Chenar, a village in Kermanshah County
Cheshmeh Kabud-e Chenar, alternate name of Chenar-e Sofla, Kermanshah
Cheshmeh Kabud-e Olya, a village in Kermanshah County
Cheshmeh Kabud-e Sofla, a village in Kermanshah County

Kurdistan Province
Cheshmeh Kabud, Kurdistan, a village in Kamyaran County

Lorestan Province
Cheshmeh Kabud, Borujerd
Cheshmeh Kabud, Delfan (disambiguation)
 Cheshmeh Kabud, Itivand-e Shomali
 Cheshmeh Kabud, Kakavand-e Sharqi
 Cheshmeh Kabud, Mirbag-e Shomali
Cheshmeh Kabud, Kuhdasht
Cheshmeh Kabud, alternate name of Seyyed Ahmad Shah
Cheshmeh Kabud, Pol-e Dokhtar

Razavi Khorasan Province
Cheshmeh Kabud, Razavi Khorasan